Price of gold may refer to:

Price of gold, using gold as an investment
"The Price of Gold", a 2011 episode of  the fairy tale/drama television series Once Upon a Time.
The Price of Gold, a 2014 sports film documentary that is part of the 30 for 30 series.

Gold prices are changing continuously. The timely and right info about gold will help you to make better investment decisions.